Eurema herla, the pink grass yellow, is a butterfly in the family Pieridae. It is found in northern and eastern Australia.

Adults are yellow, with a smoothly rounded black area at the upperside of the forewings and dark dots at the ends of the veins at the margin of the upper side of the hindwings. The underside of the forewings is, while the underside of the hindwings is orange with some indistinct darker bands.

The larvae feed on Cassia mimosoides.

References

herla
Butterflies described in 1826